Black Fury is a 1935 American crime film directed by Michael Curtiz and starring Paul Muni, Karen Morley, and William Gargan. It was adapted by Abem Finkel and Carl Erickson from the short story "Jan Volkanik" by Judge Michael A. Musmanno and the play Bohunk by Harry R. Irving. The plot is based on a historic incident during a Pennsylvania walk-out in 1929, in which John Barkowski, a striking coal miner, was beaten to death by private company police.

In 1936, at the 8th Academy Awards, Muni was not officially nominated for the Academy Award for Best Actor, but he came in second on the basis of write-in votes, which were allowed that year.

Plot
Set in Pennsylvania coal country, the film tells the story of Joe Radek (Paul Muni), a miner of Slavic background. Upset after an argument with his girlfriend Anna Novak (Karen Morley), he drinks and attends a union meeting, where he acts as a catalyst to splitting the union members into radical and moderate factions; radically inclined miners decide to walk out and strike, the others led by Radek's best friend Mike Shemanski (John Qualen) stay at work. Meanwhile, the company brings in a private police force cobbled out of thugs by a Pinkerton-type detective agency.

One night, when three drunk company cops are trying to violate Shemanski's daughter, both friends reunite in defending her honor. During the fight, Shemanski is killed by McGee (Barton MacLane), and Radek is injured and hospitalized. While he is recovering, the strike ends with no results and Shemanski's murder stays unpunished. Angry Radek collects dynamite and provision and decides to start his own underground protest by hiding in the mine during the daytime and blowing up company property at night. His exploits draw the national attention after being reported by the media. Corrupted company cops are trying to catch Radek in the mine; he fights back with dynamite sticks and accidentally seals himself and Shemanski's murderer McGee in a mine tunnel. After an epic fight Radek emerges from the mine with subdued company policeman to deliver him to justice, and as a winner in the court of public opinion he is able to influence more favorable union contract for his mining buddies, making amends with his girlfriend as well.

Cast

 Paul Muni as Joe Radek
 Karen Morley as Anna Novak
 William Gargan as Slim Johnson
 Barton MacLane as McGee
 John Qualen as Mike Shemanski (credited as John T. Qualen)
 J. Carrol Naish as Steve Croner (credited as J. Carroll Naish)
 Vince Barnett as Kubanda
 Tully Marshall as Tommy Poole
 Henry O'Neill as John W. Hendricks
 Joseph Crehan as Johnny Farrell  (credited as Joe Crehan)
 Mae Marsh as Mrs. Mary Novak
 Sara Haden as Sophie Shemanski (credited as Sarah Haden)
 Willard Robertson as Mr. J.J. Welsh
 Effie Ellsler as Bubitschka
 Wade Boteler as Mulligan
 Egon Brecher as Alec Novak
 G. Pat Collins as Lefty, a Company Policeman  (credited as George Pat Collins)
 Ward Bond as Mac, a Company Policeman
 Akim Tamiroff as Sokolsky (credited as Akin Tamiroff)
 Purnell Pratt as Henry B. Jenkins
 Eddie Shubert as Butch

Production
Pennsylvania state legislator and former coal miner Michael Musmanno acted to ban the private Coal and Iron Police after the murder of miner John Barkoski in Imperial, Pennsylvania, in 1929. Later he wrote a short story about the incident changing the name of the miner to "Jan Volkanik." Musmanno's story and the play Bohunk by Harry R. Irving (1894–1960) were adapted for the film in a screenplay written by Abem Finkel and Carl Erickson. In Black Fury, John Barkoski is fictionalized as Mike Shemanski. In 1966, Musmanno published a novel version of the screenplay also named Black Fury.

Reception
Andre David Sennwald Jr. of The New York Times wrote in April 1935, "Magnificently performed by Paul Muni, it comes up taut against the censorial safety belts and tells a stirring tale of industrial war in the coal fields." He described it as "the most notable American experiment in social drama since Our Daily Bread.'" The film was banned in several American states as inciting social conflict.

Honors
In 1936, a year in which the Academy Awards accepted write-in votes, Paul Muni came in second for Best Actor for his performance.

References

External links 

Still #1, #2, and #3 at gettyimages.com

1935 crime drama films
1935 films
American black-and-white films
American crime drama films
1930s English-language films
American films based on plays
Films based on short fiction
Films based on multiple works
Films directed by Michael Curtiz
Films set in Pennsylvania
Films about the labor movement
Films about mining
Warner Bros. films
1930s American films
Films scored by Bernhard Kaun